Black Stone (Crn Kamen) is the highest peak of the Jablanica massif located both in Albania and North Macedonia.

References

 

Two-thousanders of Albania
Two-thousanders of North Macedonia
Geography of Elbasan County